Temple Street is a street located in the areas of Jordan and Yau Ma Tei in Kowloon, Hong Kong. It is known for its night market and as one of the busiest flea markets at night in the territory. The night market lies in the Yau Ma Tei, Jordan part of the street. Popular with tourists and locals alike in the evening, it is also common to see the place crowded at dusk. It sells cheap merchandise and food items. The place is sometimes known as "Men's Street".

History
The road was built during the Qing dynasty and was named after the Tin Hau temple which was built on the site.

Temple Street Night Market

The Temple Street Night Market is sometimes known as Men's Street as it is popular for men's fashion. The market starts at 2 p.m., but is lively at dusk daily. Traffic is closed on the street at that time as visitors swarm into the street. There are more than a hundred stalls with colourful lights in the market. There are carts bulging with goods from clothing to mobile phones and watches. Stalls have items mainly for men, jeans, t-shirts, pants, lighters, shoes and men's accessories. Low-priced merchandise is common in the night market. Cheap second hand goods such as cassettes, video tapes, old newspapers, antiques are also sold there. Like in other night markets in Southeast Asia, prices can always be negotiated by bargaining.

Attractions
Tourists can do shopping and enjoy a Cantonese opera show.

Clinics
Old Chinese clinics exist on this street which employ Traditional Chinese medicine for treating illnesses and diseases. They are known as TCM physicians (dubbed the "Masters") and many have run these clinics for many years.

Food and beverage
The night market is famous for its snacks and roadside dining, which serves local street cuisine. It sells a wide range of delicious local delicacies.

There are also many restaurants selling seafood. These rice hot pots can be perfect for an intimate dinner. They are delicious as well as affordable. All of these culinary delicacies represent Hong Kong's traditional and unique food culture.

Temple Street Festival
During September 2003, the inaugural Temple Street Festival was organised and was supported by the Home Affairs Bureau and the Hong Kong Tourism Board.

Transport
The nearest MTR stations to Temple Street are Jordan station Exit A in ten minutes and Yau Ma Tei station Exit C one minute.

In popular culture
The unique characteristics of Temple Street make it a desirable location for filming. It is often used as a setting to portray all walks of life in Hong Kong. Also, many gangster films depict the place as a street of crime. The place is featured in films such as Queen of Temple Street (1990) and The Prince of Temple Street (1992).

Temple Street also plays a prominent role in the Stephen Chow film The God of Cookery, the Fiona Sit series C'est La Vie, Mon Chéri, and the TVB series Street Fighters (廟街·媽·兄弟) which starred Hacken Lee and Edmond Leung.

See also
 Tin Hau Temple Complex, Yau Ma Tei
 Mido Cafe
 Ladies' Market
 List of places in Hong Kong
 Temple Street, Singapore
 List of streets and roads in Hong Kong

References

External links

 Photo gallery of Temple Street

Kwun Chung
Roads in Kowloon
Yau Ma Tei
Odonyms referring to religion